Suicide Battalion is a 1958 World War II film directed by Edward L. Cahn and starring Mike Connors and John Ashley, who made the film while on leave from the United States Army.  In 1968, it was remade for television by Larry Buchanan as Hell Raiders, which was the film's original working title.

American International Pictures originally released it as a double feature with Jet Attack.

Premise
The story takes place during World War II in the Philippines.  A group of American soldiers are recruited for a dangerous mission to destroy an enemy base and keep strategic documents out of the reach of the invading Imperial Japanese Army.

Main cast
 
 Mike Connors as Major Matt McCormack
 John Ashley as Pvt. Tommy Novello
 Jewell Lain as Elizabeth Ann Mason
 Russ Bender as Sgt. Harry Donovan
 Bing Russell as Lt. Chet Hall
 Scott Peters as Pvt. Wally Zagorsky
 Walter Maslow as Pvt. Marty Green
 John McNamara as Colonel Craig
 Clifford Kawada as Colonel Hiosho
 Bob Tetrick as Pvt Bill
 Marjorie Stapp as Beverly
 Jan Englund as Annette
 Isabel Cooley as Julie
 Hilo Hattie as Mama Lily
 Sammee Tong as Papa Lily
 Art Gilmore as Captain Hendry
 Jackie Joseph as Cho-Cho

Production
The film was an original story by Lou Rusoff reportedly based on the capture of General William Dean during the Korean War. It was announced for production in November 1955 as Hell Raiders. It was to star Lance Fuller who had made Apache Woman for producer Alex Gordon and had signed a ten-film deal with AIP  (or ARC as it was then known), to make two films a year for five years. Filming was to begin January 1956.

Filming was pushed back and Fuller did not make the movie. In April 1956 AIP announced that Richard Denning would star and that Edward L. Cahn would direct. Denning ended up not appearing in the film either, which was not made until late 1957.

Filming began on 12 November 1957. Star John Ashley was doing a six-month stint in the army at the time. The producers got him an early release to make the movie. Ashley later had a noted association with filmmaking in the Philippines.

Reception
"A very poor man's half-Naked half-dead" wrote the Los Angeles Times. "The good basic idea is hopelessly messed up with tritisms." Jackie Joseph called it "this B minus war movie."

See also
 List of American films of 1958

References

External links
 
 

Suicide Battalion at BFI
Suicide Battalion at Letterbox DVD
Review of film at Harrison Reports
Review of film at Variety

Films directed by Edward L. Cahn
American war films
1950s English-language films
1958 films
American black-and-white films
American International Pictures films
Pacific War films
Films set in the Philippines
Films scored by Ronald Stein
1950s American films